Gerri Russell is an American romantic fiction author, currently residing in the Pacific Northwest with her family.

Writing career and awards

Before publishing her first novel, Russell's career started in a variety of writing fields, beginning as a newspaper columnist in college.  Upon graduation, she worked as a broadcast journalist, newspaper reporter, magazine columnist, technical writer and editor and instructional designer.

Russell's first award was the Romance Writers of America Golden Heart in 1998 for her paranormal romance, Remember Me.  She won another Golden Heart in 2002 in the short historical category with The Warrior Trainer. The same book won the American Title II contest, sponsored by Romantic Times Bookreviews magazine and Dorchester Publishing in 2006. Russell began writing when her daughter was three years old. Prior to selling The Warrior Trainer to Dorchester Publishing, Russell wrote seven novels, several partials and sought publication for thirteen years.

For the November 2009 issue of RT Book Reviews Magazine (issue #309), Russell interviewed Diana Gabaldon about her seventh book in the Outlander series, An Echo in the Bone.

Personal life and interests
A history buff from a young age, Russell's novels are based on real-life historic people from the early 14th century. Her goal is to not leave footprints on history while writing. Russell's fascination with history extended to her spare time where she often worked for one weekend each summer as a living history re-enactor at the Shrewsbury Reinaissance Faire in Kings Valley, Oregon.

The Warrior Trainer

Scotia, the heroine in Russell's first novel, The Warrior Trainer, is based on a real-life female from Scotland's history.  Russell first learned of Scotia while at a demonstration by the Seattle Knights. Her research involved finding a first source reference that linked Scotia to Scotland's past.  Russell discovered evidence of Scotia's existence in a book detailing the lineage of Scottish kings.

The Warrior Trainer was initially rejected by several publishers for having a main female character who was considered too strong.

Bibliography

Scottish Stones of Destiny Series

The Warrior Trainer, 2007, re-released 2015
Warrior's Bride, 2007, re-released 2015
Warrior's Lady, 2008, re-released 2015

Brotherhood of the Scottish Templars Series

To Tempt a Knight, 2009, re-released 2014
Seducing the Knight, 2010, re-released 2014
A Knight to Desire, 2012
Border Lord's Bride, 2014

Highland Bachelor Series
A Laird for Christmas, 2013
This Laird of Mine, 2013

Contemporary Titles
Flirting with Felicity, 2015

References

External links
 Gerri Russell Official Homepage

21st-century American novelists
American romantic fiction writers
American women novelists
Living people
Novelists from Washington (state)
Writers of historical fiction set in the Middle Ages
Writers of historical romances
21st-century American women writers
Seattle University alumni
Year of birth missing (living people)